Zinc finger and SCAN domain containing 30 is a protein that in humans is encoded by the ZSCAN30 gene.

References

Further reading 

Human proteins